Luis Roberto Furlán Collver (born in 1948, in Guatemala City) is a Guatemalan electrical engineer.

In 1992, Luis Furlán introduced the Internet to his country, and is thus regarded in Guatemalan media as the "Father of the Internet in Guatemala".

Luis Furlán is an electrical engineer and physicist by training.

External links
 : Revista Domingo, p. D-22 (Spanish)- La hija de Internet > Nace la Red > Guatemala se conecta
 : 
 : Siglo XXI (Spanish) - Los nuestros: Promueve aplicar tecnología a la educación

Guatemalan computer scientists
Computer systems researchers
1948 births
Living people
People from Guatemala City